Admiral Abbot may refer to:

Charles Abbot, 2nd Baron Colchester (1798–1867), British Royal Navy admiral
Charles S. Abbot (born 1945), U.S. Navy admiral
James Lloyd Abbot Jr. (1918–2012), U.S. Navy rear admiral
Peter Abbott (1942–2015), British Royal Navy admiral